King Guy can refer to:

Guy of Lusignan, King of Jerusalem 1186–1192, King of Cyprus 1192–1194
Constantine II, King of Armenia, born Guy de Lusignan, from 1342–1344
Guy III of Spoleto, King of Italy in 889 and Holy Roman Emperor in 891 until his death in 894